The 1988 NCAA Division III men's basketball tournament was the 14th annual single-elimination tournament to determine the national champions of National Collegiate Athletic Association (NCAA) men's Division III collegiate basketball in the United States.

Held during March 1988, the field included thirty-two teams and the final championship rounds were contested at Calvin College in Grand Rapids, Michigan.

Ohio Wesleyan defeated Scranton, 92–70, to claim their first NCAA Division III national title.

Bracket

Regional No. 1

Regional No. 2

Regional No. 3

Regional No. 4

Regional No. 5

Regional No. 6

Regional No. 7

Regional No. 8

National Quarterfinals

See also
1988 NCAA Division I men's basketball tournament
1988 NCAA Division II men's basketball tournament
1988 NCAA Division III women's basketball tournament
1988 NAIA Division I men's basketball tournament

References

NCAA Division III men's basketball tournament
NCAA Men's Division III Basketball
Ncaa Tournament
NCAA Division III basketball tournament